Richard Helyer (died 1446) was Archdeacon of Barnstaple from 1442 to 1445 and Archdeacon of Cornwall from 1445 to 1446.

References

1446 deaths
Archdeacons of Barnstaple
Archdeacons of Cornwall
Year of birth unknown